The CUNY School of Medicine is a medical school that began operations in fall 2016 as part of the City University of New York. The school is in Hamilton Heights on the campus of the City College of New York and partners with Saint Barnabas Health System in the South Bronx for clinical medical education.

Currently, CUNY School of Medicine offers a seven-year medical program (B.S./M.D.) at The City College of the City University of New York. It is an integrated baccalaureate education with preclinical medical education. Entrance to the school is highly competitive, with an acceptance rate around 4%, rivaling the Ivy League.

History
The school was established in 1973 as Sophie Davis School of Biomedical Education to address the growing need in the United States—especially in inner city areas—for primary care physicians.  Sophie Davis accepted students who graduated from high schools throughout New York State and attracted talented New York City high school graduates of diverse cultural and ethnic backgrounds. Sophie Davis prioritizes students that belong to minorities, including those of African-American and Hispanic descent. It had a rigorous course curriculum where approximately 40% of graduates became primary care physicians. Those who choose not to become primary care physicians repaid the school a fee. The Sophie Davis School of Biomedical Education was named after Sophie Kesner, who was Leonard Davis's wife; Mr. Davis, a graduate of CCNY, was a major benefactor of the school. Leonard Davis was a donor to the Leonard Davis Institute of Health Economics.

Students completed their undergraduate work (B.S.) and the first two years of medical school at Sophie Davis, completed the USMLE Step 1), and transferred to one of the accompanying medical schools to finish their final two years of medical school, which are primarily medical rotations, before earning their M.D. degree. NYU School of Medicine, SUNY Downstate Medical Center, New York Medical College, Albany Medical College, Northeast Ohio Medical University, Dartmouth Medical School, and Stony Brook School of Medicine were match schools for Sophie Davis graduates.

In 2016, Sophie Davis became part of the new CUNY School of Medicine, where students complete their clinical training. Students no longer transfer to another medical school to complete their training, and now graduate from the CUNY School of Medicine itself.

Location
The school's address is 160 Convent Ave, Harris Hall, Room 107, New York, NY 10031.

In 2003 it moved into its permanent home in Townsend Harris Hall, which had been renovated as part of CCNY's Terra Cotta Restoration Project, and to build modern teaching capabilities into its classrooms, seminar rooms, a long-distance conference room, and teaching laboratories.

External links
 CUNY School of Medicine official website

References 

City College of New York
Medicine
Educational institutions established in 2016
Schools of medicine in New York City
2016 establishments in New York City
Education in Harlem